Koolimuttam  is a village situated near Kodungallur in Thrissur district in the state of Kerala, India

Demographics
 India census, Koolimuttam had a population of 12116 with 5610 males and 6506 females.

Economy
This village is spanned between Arabian sea and Perumthodu (Big Nallah).The people here are mainly involved in fishing, farming and NRI .

Temples
Killikulangara Snake temple is also situated here.
Sree Maniyam Kadu Bagavathy temple which is part of history
Cherupalani Subramanya temple
Bhajanamadam sri muruga temple

History
Historically there was a platform or stage(thattu) situated in the present thattungal play ground, used mainly by the local Muslim community, later this place was called as thattungal

Schools
There are five schools here to provide basic education for children
 
 ►Upper Primary School Emmadu
 ►K M Upper primary School Thattungal
 ►Lower Primary School Mandathra
 ►Lower Primary School Kazhuvilangu
 ►Nabeesa Primary School Kathikode
 ►Al Aqsa Public School Kathikode

Suburbs and villages
The places in Koolimuttam village are Poklai, Thattungal, Oomanthara, Nedumparambu, Emmadu, Praniyadu, Thriveni, Kathikode and Bhajanamadam beach (Kaithakkadu bhajanamadam beach). Its west border is Arabian sea, the beautiful beach.
The Koolimuttam Post Office and Village Office is situated in Thattungal.

References

Villages in Thrissur district